Curtailment may refer to:

 Restricting or limiting civil liberties
 Jurisdiction stripping or curtailment of jurisdiction, Congressional limitation of a court's jurisdiction 
 Principal curtailment, reducing the mortgage life by making extra payments
 Travel insurance, coverage of pre-paid expenses due to specific causes for premature termination of travel
 Reduction of energy production due to transmission constraints or insufficient demand